Mesi is a mountain village on the island Naxos, Greece. It is part of the municipal unit Drymalia.

Its name is probably due to its location in the middle between Komiaki and the northeastern coast of Naxos. In ancient times Mesi depended on the community of Skado. In 1955 it had roughly 180 residents. At the 2011 census it numbered 97 residents.

References

Naxos
Populated places in Naxos (regional unit)